Kalannie is a small town in the Shire of Dalwallinu, in the Wheatbelt region of Western Australia, approximately  north-east of the state capital, Perth.

Kalannie was gazetted as a townsite in 1929. The name is Aboriginal, and is in a list of names from the York area where the meaning is given as "where the Aboriginals got white stone for their spears".

In 1932 the Wheat Pool of Western Australia announced that the town would have two grain elevators, each fitted with an engine, installed at the railway siding.

The main resources in Kalannie are wheat and gypsum. Kalannie is connected to the narrow gauge rail network from a branch-line on the Amery to Bonnie Rock section. The town is a receival site for Cooperative Bulk Handling.

References

External links

Towns in Western Australia
Grain receival points of Western Australia
Shire of Dalwallinu